Rüütli is an Estonian surname, meaning "knights". Notable people with the surname include:

Aksel Herman Rüütli (1893–1976), politician 
Karel Rüütli (born 1978), politician
Tarmo Rüütli (born 1954), football coach and former player

See also 
Rüütel

Estonian-language surnames